Emmonak is a city in Kusilvak Census Area, Alaska, United States. At the 2010 census the population was 762, down from 767 in 2000.

Geography
Emmonak is located in the large delta of the Yukon River at  (62.777328, -164.544920).

Emmonak is one of the last permanent settlements along the Yukon before it empties out into Bering Sea.

Climate

Demographics

Emmonak first appeared on the 1970 U.S. Census as an incorporated city (having incorporated in 1964), although was erroneously called "Emanguk." It was the successor community to Kwiguk, which was located a mile and a half south, most of whose residents removed to the new village of Emmonak in 1964 after flooding damaged the old village, including their cannery.

As of the census of 2000, there were 767 people, 189 households, and 150 families residing in the city. The racial makeup of the city was 5.61% White, 0.26% Black or African American, 91.26% Native American, 0.13% Asian, and 2.74% from two or more races. 1.04% of the population were Hispanic or Latino of any race.

There were 189 households, out of which 55.6% had children under the age of 18 living with them, 47.1% were married couples living together, 18.0% had a female householder with no husband present, and 20.6% were non-families. 16.9% of all households were made up of individuals, and 3.2% had someone living alone who was 65 years of age or older. The average household size was 4.06 and the average family size was 4.58.

In the city, the age distribution of the population shows 44.1% under the age of 18, 8.3% from 18 to 24, 27.2% from 25 to 44, 15.4% from 45 to 64, and 5.0% who were 65 years of age or older. The median age was 23 years. For every 100 females, there were 116.7 males. For every 100 females age 18 and over, there were 113.4 males.

The median income for a household in the city was $32,917, and the median income for a family was $38,750. Males had a median income of $23,750 versus $18,542 for females. The per capita income for the city was $9,069. About 16.4% of families and 16.2% of the population were below the poverty line, including 15.9% of those under age 18 and 9.1% of those age 65 or over.

Winter 2008–2009 Energy Crisis
In the winter of 2008–2009, a combination of a cold winter and increased fuel prices led to economic hardship. Due to a collapse in local king salmon fisheries in 2008, residents were unable to buy increased amounts of heating oil at higher prices. On January 10, 2009 Nicholas C. Tucker, Sr., a town elder, circulated a letter asking for aid. The letter was circulated by Alaska bloggers, where it was picked up by national media.

Education
K-12 students attend Emmonak School, operated by the Lower Yukon School District.

References

Cities in Alaska
Cities in Kusilvak Census Area, Alaska
Yukon River